The Women's Press was a feminist publishing company established in London in 1977. Throughout the late 1970s and the 1980s, the Women's Press was a highly visible presence, publishing feminist literature.

Founding
In 1977, Stephanie Dowrick cofounded The Women's Press with publishing entrepreneur Naim Attallah. Attallah owned Quartet Books, which had previously partnered with Virago Press, and Virago's success inspired Attallah to collaborate with Dowrick and her conviction that "There was space for a new feminist publishing house that would reflect one of the most exciting political currents in society and make commercial sense." As Attallah recalled,

The logo of The Women's Press was a clothes iron, a witty play on the symbol of domestic labour associated with women, with black and white strips running down the books' spine to represent an iron's electric cord. Dowrick was soon joined by Sibyl Grundberg, and in February 1978 The Women's Press issued its first five books, including Lolly Willowes by Sylvia Townsend-Warner and a reprint of Jane Austen's Love and Freindship. Other reprints in the 1978 list included Elizabeth Barrett Browning's Aurora Leigh and Kate Chopin's The Awakening. Unlike Virago, The Women's Press emphasised contemporary works over classics and understood itself as raising consciousness and making effective contributions to sexual politics over a range of areas, including peace politics, psychoanalysis, art history, ecology, and race as well as gender politics. They operated with an informal advisory group of feminist academics and media workers.

1980s
In 1982, Ros de Lanerolle became managing director. Under Dowrick's leadership The Women's Press had differentiated itself from Virago by emphasising contemporary political concerns, using the slogan "Live Authors, Live Issues". Dowrick had published many of the leading radical feminist writers of the day, including Andrea Dworkin, Phyllis Chesler, Shulamith Firestone, Louise Berkinow, Susan Griffin, as well as Canadian writers including Alice Munro and Joan Barfoot. Their early fiction writers included Janet Frame (NZ), Lisa Alther (USA), Joyce Kornblatt (USA) and Michele Roberts (UK). They published a number of books in collaboration with Frauenoffensive, Munich, and Sara, Amsterdam. Early commissioned writers included Joanna Ryan, Lucy Goodison and Sheila Ernst. De Lanerolle continued the Press's effort to publish Black and Third World women's writing. Among early African-American writers to be published were Toni Cade Bambara and Alice Walker, as well as Maori writer Patricia Grace (NZ). In 1983, the Press had commercial success with the British publication of Alice Walker's bestseller The Color Purple, and it also published Tsitsi Dangarembga's Nervous Conditions (1988) and Pauline Melville's Shape-Shifter (1990). From 1985 to 1991, the Press also had a feminist science fiction list.

However, a publishing recession in the late 1980s and early 1990s left The Women's Press making losses. Though de Lanerolle argued that the cause was a general recession, and that the company was recovering, Attallah blamed the attention paid to Third World women writers [This is arguable. As a Palestinian, Attallah had given great emphasis in his own publishing to marginalised Middle Eastern writers]. In late 1990, Attallah appointed Mary Hemming as deputy managing director, and in early 1991 rejected an attempted buyout offer of £500,000 by de Lanerolle. De Lanerolle was forced to resign and accept a redundancy payout, and five other staff resigned in solidarity with her. Attallah appointed himself the firm's interim managing director and briefly recalled Dowrick from Australia, before they together appointed Kathy Gale as managing director. Twenty-three Women's Press authors, including Merle Collins, Michèle Roberts, Gillian Slovo and Sheila Jeffreys, wrote to The Guardian to distance themselves from Attallah's actions. Stephanie Dowrick was appointed chair and continued in that role for many years.

References

External links
 The Women's Press at the Internet Speculative Fiction Database

1977 establishments in the United Kingdom
Publishing companies established in 1977
Book publishing companies of the United Kingdom
Feminist mass media
Defunct book publishing companies
Companies with year of disestablishment missing